Peak Corporate Network is an American group of real estate services companies based in Los Angeles, California. Eleven entities operate under the Peak umbrella.

Overview
Established in 1991 by Los Angeles businessmen Eli Tene and Gil Priel, Peak originally focused on short sale transactions. In 2007, Peak started a private lending fund through a partnership with a $12 billion private family office.

In a bid to expand its operations in Southern California, Peak became a real estate franchisee of Century 21 Real Estate in September 2015. The following month, Century 21 Peak acquired Granada Hills, Los Angeles-based Century 21 All Moves, Century 21's oldest franchise. The acquisition of All Moves added about 100 employees to Century 21 Peak's residential real estate operation and increased Peak Corporate Network's total staff to 300 people. Peak subsequently expanded into the Inland Empire with the acquisition of two Upland, California-based firms: American Inland Empire R.E. Inc. in December 2016 and Century 21 Prestige in February 2017.

In May 2014, Peak Finance, a division of Peak Corporate Network, and Misuma Holdings, acquired the Myrtle Beach Mall in South Carolina for $45 million. In May 2016, Peak Financial and Misuma announced they would begin a $30 million renovation of the mall in 2017. In July 2017, Peak Finance secured nearly $103 million in financing for a North Hollywood, Los Angeles complex consisting of 297 apartments and a 365 By Whole Foods Market. Peak is the owner of InterServ, one of the largest nationwide hospitality renovation companies in the U.S.

References

External links
 

Real estate services companies of the United States
Real estate companies established in 1990
American companies established in 1990
Companies based in Los Angeles